The title of Marquis of Caracena ( is a Spanish  title of nobility bestowed in 1624 by King Philip IV of Spain on Luis Carrillo de Toledo whom he had elevated from the title of Count of Caracena which King Philip III of Spain had previously granted in 1599. The 1st Marquis of Caracena was also later created as Count of Pinto.

The title is toponymic, named after the municipality of Caracena in the province of Soria.

References
 Elenco de Grandezas y Títulos Nobiliarios Españoles. Instituto "Salazar y Castro"

Marquessates in the Spanish nobility